Tortanidae is a family of copepods within the order Calanoida. The tropicus group of this species can be found in the tropical and subtropical waters of Southeast Asia. The groups are distinguishable by their genitals and their tails.

References

 Vengassi, F. (n.d.). A new species of Tortanus (Atortus) (Copepoda, Calanoida, Tortanidae) from Minicoy Island, southeastern Arabian Sea. Turkish Journal of Zoology, 43(5), 425–436.

Calanoida
Crustacean families